is a Japanese author known for his horror novels. His most famous works include the Vampire Hunter D series, Darkside Blues and Wicked City.

Biography
Kikuchi was born in Chōshi, Japan on September 25, 1949. He attended Aoyama Gakuin University and was trained as a writer by famed author Kazuo Koike. His first novel, Demon City Shinjuku, was published in 1982. While his first novels are typical novel prose, as he gained fame, he adapted a more terse writing style.

Kikuchi became close friends with writer and director Yoshiaki Kawajiri during his adaption of Wicked City and the two have since collaborated on Vampire Hunter D: Bloodlust and the OVA of Demon City Shinjuku.

Works

Novels

Demon City Shinjuku series
The series takes place in a world where Shinjuku has been turned into a city of demons and monsters, and follows a young man named Kyoya Izayoi, user of the mystical art of Nempo, who must discover how the disaster relates to his own family.

 (published September 30, 1982)

 (published May 11, 1988)

Demon City Blues series

Demon City Nowaru series
This story follows Fuyuharu Aki, Setsura Aki's cousin.

Vampire Hunter D series

Wicked City series

Treasure Hunter series
A series of young adult fiction novels (also called the Alien Series for use of "alien" in each title), the story follows a seemingly ordinary high schooler named Dai Yagashira, who journeys around the world collecting rare and supernatural treasures. A member of ITHA (International Treasure Hunters Association) and heir to a family of treasure hunters, Yagashira fights soldiers, private militia, and fellow treasure hunters using both high-tech weapons and powerful artifacts. While the original illustrations were provided by Yoshitaka Amano (with the exception of the illustrations by Masahiro Shibata for “Black Death Empire”), the illustrations in the bound volumes are by Koichiro Yonemura.

Others
Invader Summer (インベーダー・サマー) (published August 30, 1983 with illustrations by Yoshitaka Amano)
A Wind Named Amnesia (風の名はアムネジア) (published October 31, 1983 with illustrations by Yoshitaka Amano)
Evil Deity Gourmet (妖神グルメ) (published on June 30, 1984 with illustrations by Yoshitaka Amano, republished in February 2000)
Meiji Dorakyuu Den (published in United States as Dark Wars: The Tale of Meiji Dracula)

Invader Summer and A Wind Named Amnesia were republished together in one volume in August 2005, with illustrations by Eiji Kaneda.

Manga
Darkside Blues
Demon Palace Babylon
Vampire Hunter D
Taimashin
Taimashin - Masatsu Note
Masatsu Note Taimashin Toudouhen (sequel to Taimashin - Masatsu Note)
Taimashin: Akamushi Masatsukou
Shibito no Ken
Shin Shibito no Ken (sequel to Shibito no Ken)
Makai Toshi Hunter
Makai Toshi Hunter Series: Makyuu Babylon (side story)
Makai Toshi <Shinjuku> (side story)
Blue Rescue
Alien Hihouden
Jashin Sensen Risutora Boy
Makai Ishi Mephisto
Majin Keiji
Makai Gakuen
Mokushiroku Senshi
Rappa (SASAKURA Kou)

Novelizations
 Leda: The Fantastic Adventure of Yohko (幻夢戦記レダ Genmu Senki Leda)

Short stories
D - Armageddon
Portrait of Ixobel
D - Village in the Fog
D - Castle Dweller
D - Night on the Highway
A Message from Cecil
D - Throng of Heretics

See also
:Category:Novels by Hideyuki Kikuchi

External links
DHpress Books
Digital Manga Publishing
Asahi Sonorama - Japanese publisher of the Vampire Hunter D series and the Treasure Hunter Series books and audio dramas.
Hideyuki Kikuichi Official Fan Club (Japanese)

Synopsis of Tales of the Ghost Sword (Yukensho) at JLPP (Japanese Literature Publishing Project) 

 
Japanese horror writers
Light novelists
Living people
1949 births
Anime screenwriters
Aoyama Gakuin University alumni
People from Chōshi